Prior to the Synod of Ráth Breasail the Catholic Church in Ireland did not have a diocesan system of governance. The reforming councils of the Church brought Ireland into line with the rest of the Church and established a diocesan system. Today twenty-six dioceses remain while others have been merged and still others have become extinct or used as titular sees.

Titular dioceses
Inis Cathaigh
Ceanannus Mór
Glendalough
Slebte
Cluain Iraird

References

Irish titular sees